The Gov. James W. Nye Mansion, at 108 N. Minnesota St. in Carson City, Nevada, United States, was built in 1860.  It has also been known as St. Teresa's Rectory.  It was a home of U.S. senator William M. Stewart and of Nevada territory governor James W. Nye.

It is a -story stone house built on a large lot.  It became an unofficial Governor's Mansion after Governor Nye purchased the house in 1862.

See also
List of the oldest buildings in Nevada

References

External links

Historic American Buildings Survey in Nevada
Houses completed in 1860
Houses on the National Register of Historic Places in Nevada
National Register of Historic Places in Carson City, Nevada
Houses in Carson City, Nevada